Luftverkehr Friesland-Harle, commonly abbreviated LFH, was a small airline based in Wangerland, Germany, that was established in 1983 and had 30 employees (at March 2007). It operated scheduled and chartered passenger and cargo flights, linking Harle Airfield (de) to the East Frisian Islands. In 2011, LFH was acquired by FLN Frisia Luftverkehr, which continues to use the brand.

Destinations
As of 2013, LFH operated scheduled services between its base at Harle and Wangerooge, on-demand flights to the other East Frisian Islands of Langeoog, Baltrum, Norderney, Juist and Borkum, as well as to Heligoland. Also, at times, the airline was contracted to operate flights in Estonia.

Fleet

As of August 2013, the LFH fleet consisted of the following aircraft:

Incidents and accidents
On 3 March 2007 at around 16:40 local time, an LFH Britten-Norman Islander (registered D-ILFB) overshot the runway at Ruhnu Airfield in Estonia during a poor-weather landing following a domestic flight from Pärnu. The aircraft was destroyed when it crashed into trees, but the pilot and the two passengers on board survived the accident.
Another one of the company's Islanders, registered D-ILFC, was damaged in a landing incident at Wangerooge on 29 June 2009. The aircraft, with one pilot and five passengers on board, was on a short 5-minute flight from Harle when the pilot had to abort landing twice because he was blinded by the sun. At the second go-around attempt, the aircraft slammed hard into the runway, destroying the left landing gear and substantially damaging the left wing. The pilot managed to get airborne again and performed a successful emergency landing at nearby Jever Air Base. There were no injuries.

References

External links

Official website

Defunct airlines of Germany
Airlines established in 1983
Airlines disestablished in 2014
2014 disestablishments in Germany
German companies established in 1983